Stephen Adam may refer to:
Stephen Adam (MP) (died 1405), English politician
 Stephen Adam (stained glass designer) (1848–1910), Scottish stained glass designer
Sir Stephen Timothy Forbes Adam, 4th Baronet

See also
 Stephen Adams (disambiguation)